Roe vs. Wade is a 1989 television film written by Alison Cross about the landmark 1973 United States Supreme Court decision Roe v. Wade. It was directed by Gregory Hoblit and stars Holly Hunter and Amy Madigan.

Plot
Ellen Russell is a lonely, single, poorly educated Texan who finds herself pregnant with no means to support a child. To avoid giving up the child, she seeks an abortion. Denied an abortion in Texas, the young woman hires a novice lawyer to plead her case in the U.S. Supreme Court.

Cast
 Holly Hunter as Ellen Russell
 Amy Madigan as Sarah Weddington
 Chris Mulkey as Ron Weddington
 Dion Anderson as Flowers
 Terry O'Quinn as Jay Floyd
 Stephen Tobolowsky as Darryl Horwath
 Alycia Grant as Sherry Roe
 James Avery
 Maggie Baird
 Kathy Bates
 Daniel Benzali
 Kevin Cooney

Production
Roe vs. Wade was filmed on 35mm film with an aspect ratio of 1.33:1 and mixed in stereo.

Release
The film first aired on NBC on May 15, 1989. It was the 10th most viewed primetime television show for the week, with a 17.0 Nielsen rating, and seen in an estimated 15.3 million homes.

The German TV broadcast was edited down from 100 to 91 minutes.

Awards

41st Primetime Emmy Awards

47th Golden Globe Awards

References

External links
 

1989 television films
1989 films
American legal drama films
American courtroom films
Films directed by Gregory Hoblit
NBC Productions films
Television courtroom dramas
Films set in 1970
Films set in 1971
Films set in 1973
Films set in Texas
Films about abortion
Primetime Emmy Award for Outstanding Made for Television Movie winners
American drama television films
1980s English-language films
1980s American films